John Coleman on Football was an Australian television series which aired in 1957 on Melbourne station HSV-7. It featured former footballer John Coleman. It aired in a 15-minute time-slot on Thursdays (originally at 9:30PM to 9:45PM). In an episode telecast on 18 April 1957, the series aired at 9:30PM, preceded by Hit Parade and followed by news and weather. The episode aired on 19 September 1957 aired at 10:40PM, preceded by The Late Show and followed by news and weather.

See also
The Footy Show
Football Survey
Football Inquest

References

External links

1957 Australian television series debuts
1957 Australian television series endings
Australian sports television series
English-language television shows
Black-and-white Australian television shows
Australian live television series
Lost television shows